Pople is an Anglo-French (Old French) surname. Notable people with the surname include:

John Pople (1925–2004), British theoretical chemist and 1998 Nobel laureate in chemistry
Luke Pople (born 1991), Australian wheelchair basketball player.
Rodney Pople (born 1952), Australian visual artist
Edward William Pople (emigrated from Bristol, England to Australia in 1857), Official Gov't Undertaker
Ross Pople (born 1945), New Zealand-born British conductor and classical cellist

See also

Pople (disambiguation)